The Little Green House on K Street was a residence in Washington DC, USA, where the notoriously corrupt deals of Warren Harding's presidency (1921–1923) are believed to have been planned.

History 
The Little Green House on K Street was situated at 1625 K Street, NW, in Washington. It had been constructed in 1880 by a retired attorney, J. B. Edmonds of Iowa.

The house was rented by associates of President Harding’s Attorney General Harry Daugherty, including Jess Smith and Howard Mannington, known as the Ohio Gang. According to testimony before the Senate Committee investigating the Teapot Dome bribery scandal, it was the gang’s unofficial headquarters, where many of the deals were hatched. The testimony before the Senate Committee broke down when the key witness, Roxie Stinson, admitted before the committee that she had never even seen the "little green house". The investigation was further undermined when the other key witness, Gaston Means, retracted his entire testimony in an affidavit and he admitted to jointly coaching Stinson in her testimony along with Senator Burton Wheeler.

The building was razed in 1941 to make way for the 12-story Commonwealth Building.

Legacy 
The name entered the American lexicon as a symbol of political corruption and cronyism.  The Chicago Tribune described the home as one of "the symbols of a nation's disgrace".

In 1934, Congressman Fred Britten, a Republican of Illinois, famously compared the Red House on R Street in Georgetown, where the original New Dealers strategized during the early years of the Franklin D. Roosevelt Administration, to the Little Green House on K Street.  The R Street address became known as the Brain Trust's Little Green House on K Street.<ref>Knox Explains Dinner at Mystery House, Chicago Tribune, May 4, 1943</ref> 

During the scandal involving the extramarital affairs of Senator John Ensign and Congressman Chip Pickering in 2009, commentators frequently compared their C Street homes to the Little Green House on K Street.Jacob M. Appel, Hate the Husband?  Sue the Mistress, October 6, 2009

 References 

 Further reading 

 Dean, John W. Warren G. Harding (The American Presidents Series). Times Books, Henry Holt and Company, LLC, 2004
 Downes Randolph C. The Rise of Warren Gamaliel Harding, 1865–1920. Ohio University Press, 1970
 Ferrell, Robert H. The Strange Deaths of Warren G. Harding, Columbia:MO, University of Missouri Press, 1998
 Murray Robert K. The Harding Era 1921-1923: Warren G. Harding and his Administration. University of Minnesota Press, 1969
 
 Sinclair, Andrew. The Available Man: The Life behind the Masks of Warren Gamaliel Harding'' 1965 online full-scale biography

External links 
History & Photos

Houses completed in 1880
Political scandals in the United States
Warren G. Harding
Houses in Washington, D.C.
1941 disestablishments in Washington, D.C.
Demolished buildings and structures in Washington, D.C.
Teapot Dome scandal
Buildings and structures demolished in 1941